The Adeonidae is a family within the bryozoan order Cheilostomatida. Colonies are often upright bilaminar branches or sheets, perforated by large holes in some species (e.g. Adeona cellulosa). The zooids generally have one or more adventitious avicularia on their frontal wall. Instead of ovicells the adeonids often possess enlarged polymorphs which brood the larvae internally.

Classification 
Family Adeonidae
Genus Adeona
Genus Adeonellopsis
Genus Anarthropora
Genus Bracebridgia
Genus Dimorphocella
Genus Kubaninella
Genus Meniscopora
Genus Ovaticella
Genus Poristoma
Genus Reptadeonella
Genus Schizostomella
Genus Smittistoma
Genus Teichopora
Genus Triporula
Genus Trypocella

References 

Bryozoan families
Cheilostomatida
Extant Eocene first appearances